The 2021 Baltic States Swimming Championships was held in Klaipėda, Lithuania, between March 6 and March 7.

Some events were also held separately for junior boys and girls (Baltic States Youth Swimming Meet).  Championships were broadcast live via Lithuanian National Radio and Television.

Medal table

Events 
Freestyle: 50 m, 100 m, 200 m, 400 m
Backstroke: 50 m, 100 m, 200 m
Breaststroke: 50 m, 100 m, 200 m
Butterfly: 50 m, 100 m, 200 m
Individual medley: 200 m, 400 m
Relay: 4×100 m free, 4×100 m medley

Results

Men's events

Women's events

References

2021
2021 in Lithuanian sport
2021 in swimming
International sports competitions hosted by Lithuania
Sports competitions in Klaipėda
March 2021 sports events in Europe
Swimming competitions in Lithuania